Marvelyne Fatima Wiels (born 15 May 1963) was the Minister Plenipotentiary of Curaçao between 2013 and 2016. In that capacity she was stationed in The Hague and was a member of the Council of Ministers of the Kingdom.

Personal life
Wiels was born on 15 May 1963 and is a sister of the murdered politician Helmin Wiels. She is a single mother of two children.

Minister Plenipotentiary
Wiels has received criticism for errors in her CV, amongst others relating to a MSc title, as well as the nature of her work at ABN AMRO. Also her management of the Curaçaohuis, the representation of Curaçao in the Netherlands, which falls under her responsibility, was criticized. Criticism in the latter case was related to nepotism and harassment of her deputy. A report of the Ombudsman of Curaçao regarding the criticism resulted in a motion of the parliament of Curaçao "to immediately replace her" did not gain a majority.

During the formation of the second cabinet of Prime Minister Ben Whiteman in November 2015 the Party for the Restructured Antilles (PAR) was willing to join the coalition if Wiels would resign. Wiels' party Sovereign People declined this request. The PAR was then offered the post of deputy Minister Plenipotentiary and it joined the new governing coalition.

A fourth report on the functioning of the Curaçaohuis under Wiels was highly critical. The report, and the fact that it had not been shared yet with the Estates of Curaçao, led to coalition parties in the Second Whiteman cabinet voicing severe critique in July 2016. The leader of the PAR, Zita Jesus-Leito, asked for the voluntary resignation or Wiels or else her dismissal by Whiteman.

Wiels was succeeded by Eunice Eisden on 23 December 2016.

References

1963 births
Living people
Curaçao politicians
Ministers plenipotentiary (Curaçao)
Sovereign People politicians